The Best of Al Hirt is a compilation album by Al Hirt released by RCA Victor in 1965.  The album peaked at No. 13 on the Billboard Top LPs chart.

Track listing 
 "Java" (Allen Toussaint, Alvin Tyler, Freddy Friday)
 "Stranger in Paradise" (Robert Wright, George Forrest)	
 "Bourbon Street Parade"
 "The Best Man" (featuring Ann-Margret)	
 "Stella by Starlight" (Victor Young)
 "Holiday for Trumpet"
 "I Love Paris" (Cole Porter)
 "Sugar Lips" (Billy Sherrill, Buddy Killen)
 "Poor Butterfly" (Raymond Hubbell, John Golden)
 "Cotton Candy" (Russ Damon)
 "Love Makes the World Go 'Round" (Theme from Carnival!) (Bob Merrill)
 "When the Saints Go Marching In"

Chart positions

References

1965 greatest hits albums
Al Hirt albums
RCA Records compilation albums